Behind the White Tower is a 2007 South Korean television series that aired on MBC from January 6 to March 11, 2007 on Saturdays and Sundays at 21:40 for 20 episodes.

Based on renowned Japanese novelist Toyoko Yamasaki's representative work Shiroi Kyotō, the drama brings viewers deep into the political inner workings of the medical field by taking a satirical look at malpractice and power plays at a university hospital, and contrasting the paths and personalities of two doctors played by Kim Myung-min and Lee Sun-kyun. The medical drama was a critical and ratings hit in South Korea, gaining praise for its acting (particularly by Kim), writing, direction, and its intelligent and uncompromising story without concessions to melodrama or romance.

Plot
Brilliant and ambitious, assistant professor Jang Joon-hyuk (Kim Myung-min) is a rising star in the Myeongin University Hospital surgery department. His knowledge and expertise is undeniable, but his cavalier confidence and cold personality has earned him more than a few enemies, including the department head. While Jang's drive stems from a desire for success and advancement, fellow doctor Choi Do-young (Lee Sun-kyun) is committed to the well-being of his patients, leading to frequent clashes with the practices and personnel within the hospital. With the head of the surgery department retiring, Jang seems to be the clear successor until a new rival emerges in the form of Noh Min-guk (Cha In-pyo), who has the backing of the department head. Jang, however, is determined to win at all costs.

Cast
Kim Myung-min as Jang Joon-hyuk  
Lee Sun-kyun as Choi Do-young
Cha In-pyo as Noh Min-guk
Song Seon-mi as Lee Yoon-jin
Kim Bo-kyung as Kang Hee-jae
Lee Jung-gil as Lee Joo-wan
Kim Chang-wan as Woo Yong-gil
Byun Hee-bong as Oh Kyung-hwan
Im Sung-eun as Min Soo-jung
Jung Han-yong as Min Choong-shik
Ki Tae-young as Yeom Dong-il
Lee Seung-min as Ha Eun-hye
Lee Hee-do as Yoo Pil-sang
Han Sang-jin as Park Geon-ha
Kim Yong-min as Ham Min-seung
Park Kwang-jung as Park Chang-shik
Jung Young-ook as Joon-hyuk's mother
Jang So-yeon as Yoo Mi-ra
Lee Moo-saeng as Kwon Hyung-jin
Nam Yoon-jung as Kim Young-ah
Yang Hee-kyung as Hong Sung-hee
Son Byong-ho as Kim Hoon
Park Hyuk-kwon as Hong Sang-il
Kim Do-yeon as Lee Young-soon
Jang Hyun-sung as Jo Myung-joon
Park Young-ji as Oh Nam-ki
Jung Kyung-ho as Kwon Soon-ki
Kim Jung-hak as Lee Jae-myung
Lee Ji-eun as Lee Jin-joo
Shin Kwi-shik as Won Yong-min
Choi Beom-ho as Kwon Soon-il

Awards and nominations

References

External links
  
 Behind the White Tower at MBC Global Media
 

Korean-language television shows
2007 South Korean television series debuts
2007 South Korean television series endings
MBC TV television dramas
South Korean medical television series
Television shows based on Japanese novels
Television series by Kim Jong-hak Production